Manaqib-al-Jaleela is a book on Islamic Jurisprudence (Fiqh) written by 20th century Islamic Scholar, Mohammad Abdul Ghafoor Hazarvi. This book deals with the observance of rituals, morals and social legislation in Islam, according to the Hanafi school, spreading over 9 volumes. The book is written in Urdu.

Description
This book is extended over nine volumes of six thousand pages. Each division has a distinct theme. Topics within a division are more or less in the order of revelation. Within each division, each member of the pair complements the other in various ways. The nine divisions are 
 Islamic theological jurisprudence
 Political aspects of Islam
 Islamic marital jurisprudence
 Islamic military jurisprudence
 Islamic inheritance jurisprudence
 Islamic hygienical jurisprudence
 Islamic criminal jurisprudence
 Islamic economic jurisprudence
 Adab (Islam)

See also
 List of Sunni books
 Husamul Haramain
 Fatawa-e-Razvia
 Kanzul Iman

References

Books about Islamic jurisprudence
Sunni literature
Fatwas
Islamic literature
20th-century books
Barelvi literature